Bibi Medoua (born Bibi Balbine Laure Medoua on 9 August 1993) is a Cameroonian football defender. She played for Ataşehir Belediyespor with jersey number 41 in the Turkish Women's First Football League. She is a member of the Cameroonian national team, with which she has played the 2012 Summer Olympics.

Before she transferred to Ataşehir Belediyespor in Istanbul on 14 February 2014, she played for Trabzon İdmanocağı in the first half of the 2013–2014 season.

References

External links
 Bibi Medoua at Scoresway 

1993 births
Living people
Women's association football defenders
Cameroonian women's footballers
Footballers from Yaoundé
Cameroon women's international footballers
Olympic footballers of Cameroon
Footballers at the 2012 Summer Olympics
African Games silver medalists for Cameroon
African Games medalists in football
Competitors at the 2015 African Games
Trabzon İdmanocağı women's players
Ataşehir Belediyespor players
Cameroonian expatriate women's footballers
Cameroonian expatriate sportspeople in Turkey
Expatriate women's footballers in Turkey